Requiem – Fortissimo is the third part of Virgin Black's Requiem album trilogy and its second installment since Requiem - Mezzo Forte. The album was released on February 19, 2008. Metal Storm voted Requiem - Fortissimo as The Best Doom Metal Album of 2008.

The music on this album is in a death/doom style reminiscent of early 1990s British groups like My Dying Bride and Paradise Lost.

Recording
Vocalist-keyboardist Rowan London has stated about the album:

Track listing

 "The Fragile Breath" - 5:49
 "In Winters Ash" - 7:23
 "Silent" - 6:42
 "God in Dust" - 8:39
 "Lacrimosa (Gather Me)" - 2:21
 "Darkness" - 11:45
 "Forever" - 1:14

References

External links
Blabbermouth, retrieved November 16, 2007.
Requiem - Fortissimo by Virgin Black @ Encyclopaedia Metallum

2008 albums
Virgin Black albums
The End Records albums